Keith Allain (born September 26, 1958) is an American ice hockey coach. He is currently the head coach of the Yale Bulldogs men's ice hockey team. He took over the program following Tim Taylor in 2006. In 2013, he led Yale to its first ever NCAA men's ice hockey National Championship.

Allain, who played as a goaltender with the Yale Bulldogs men's ice hockey team, was an assistant coach in the National Hockey League with the Washington Capitals from 1993–1997, and also served as the goaltending coach for the St. Louis Blues from 1998 to 2006.

Allain served as an assistant coach with the United States men's national ice hockey team at the 1992, 2006, and 2018 Winter Olympics.

Allain led teams have struggled against Quinnipiac since the NCAA championship game in 2013, compiling a record of 0-20-3.  Yale's lone victory during this span came when Allain was in South Korea for the 2018 Winter Olympics.

Playing career statistics

Head coaching record

References

External links
 Official biography, Yale Bulldogs

1958 births
Living people
American ice hockey coaches
Nashville Predators scouts
St. Louis Blues coaches
United States men's national ice hockey team coaches
Washington Capitals coaches
Washington Capitals scouts
Yale Bulldogs men's ice hockey coaches
Yale Bulldogs men's ice hockey players
American men's ice hockey goaltenders
Ice hockey coaches from Massachusetts
Ice hockey people from Worcester, Massachusetts